Arcadia Lake is a reservoir in Central Oklahoma County, Oklahoma, United States.  The lake is located northeast of Oklahoma City in eastern Edmond, just east of Interstate 35.

The lake has a surface area of 1,820 acres (7 km²) and has about 26 miles (42 km) of shoreline.

This lake was constructed as a cooperative effort between the City of Edmond and the U.S. Army Corps of Engineers. It was created to control floods in the Deep Fork River Basin, supply water to the city of Edmond, and provide recreational resources to the surrounding communities.

Recreational opportunities at Arcadia Lake include fishing, boating, camping, mountain biking, hiking, disc golf and equestrian trails. Waterskiing and Jet Skiing are both allowed in designated areas. Horse rentals are not available, so visitors must bring their own mounts. Facilities include picnic areas, a Frisbee golf course, pavilions, boat ramps, designated swim beaches and an enclosed and heated fishing dock that is handicapped accessible. Arcadia Lake also features RV campsites with full hookups and primitive tent campsites. Parks around the lake include Scissortail Park, Spring Creek Park, Central State Park and Edmond Park.

References

External links 
  Corps of Engineer data
 Arcadia Lake information and photos on TravelOK.com Official travel and tourism website for the State of Oklahoma
 

Reservoirs in Oklahoma
Protected areas of Oklahoma County, Oklahoma
Dams in Oklahoma
United States Army Corps of Engineers dams
Bodies of water of Oklahoma County, Oklahoma